Sar Asiab-e Bala may refer to:
 Sar Asiab-e Bala, Fars
 Sar Asiab-e Bala, Kerman
 Sar Asiab-e Bala, Razavi Khorasan